Sherpur Sadar is an upazila of Sherpur District in the Division of Mymensingh, Bangladesh.

Demographics
According to the 2001 Bangladesh census, Sherpur upazila had a population of 449798; males constituted 234296, females 215502; Muslim 437227, Hindu 11439, Buddhist 517, Christian 15 and others 600.

As of the 1991 Bangladesh census, Sherpur Sadar had a population of 381,419. Males constituted 51.58% of the population, and females 48.42%. This Upazila's eighteen up population was 189,019. Sherpur Sadar had an average literacy rate of 78.23% (7+ years), and the national average of 32.4% literate.

Administration
Sherpur Sadar Thana was turned into an upazila in 1984.

Sherpur Sadar Upazila is divided into Sherpur Municipality and 14 union parishads: Bajitkhila, Balairchar, Betmari Ghughurakandi, Chormochoriya, Chorpokhimari, Chorsherpur, Dhola, Gajirkhamar, Kamarar Chor, Kamariya, Losmonpur, Pakuriya, Rouha, and Vatshala. The union parishads are subdivided into 100 mauzas and 188 villages.

Sherpur Municipality is subdivided into 9 wards and 46 mahallas.

Education

There are 11 colleges in the upazila: Sherpur Government College., Sherpur Government Mohila College, Beer Muktijodda Atiur Rahman Model College, Dr. Sekander Ali College, Jamsad Ali Memorial College, Kamarar Char College, Model Girls College, Sherpur, Nizam Uddin Ahmed Model College, Sanuwer Hosen Model College, Shahid Abdur Rashid Commerce College and Sherpur Biggan College. Other schools include Ideal Preparatory and High School (1991), Govt victoria academy, Govt girls high school, and Nobarun public school.

According to Banglapedia, Sherpur Government Victoria Academy (1887), GK Pilot High School, founded in 1919, Sapmari High School (1907), and Sherpur High School (1920) are notable secondary schools.Sherpur is the birth place of numerous highly educated doctors and engineers, also people of different occupations.

See also
 Upazilas of Bangladesh
 Districts of Bangladesh
 Divisions of Bangladesh

References

Upazilas of Sherpur District